Phycita eulepidella is a moth of the family Pyralidae first described by George Hampson in 1896. It is found in western Malaysia, Australia and probably in Sri Lanka.

Its caterpillars are known to feed on Jasminum sambac and Ixora species.

References

External links
Taxonomic review of the superfamily Pyraloidea in Bhutan

Moths of Australia
Moths of Asia
Moths described in 1896
Phycitini